The Azadegan oil field is an oil field in Iran.

History
The first exploration well was drilled in the field in 1976, but its discovery was finalized after drilling the second well in 1999.

Reserves
It is one of the NIOC Recent Discoveries and the biggest oil field found in Iran in the last 30 years.

Sarvak, Kazhdomi, Godvan, and Fahilan are productive layers of the field. Crude oil produced by the Fahilan layer is light while the other layers yield heavy crude.

See also

Yadavaran Field
World Largest Gas Fields
NIOC Recent Discoveries
South Pars Gas Field
Iran Natural Gas Reserves
North Pars
Golshan Gas Field
Ferdowsi Gas Field
Persian LNG

References

Other sources
Atimes
NIOC

Oil fields of Iran